Latre (Spanish pronunciation: [latɾe]) is a locality situated in the municipality of Caldearenas (Alto Gállego, Huesca, Aragon, Spain). In 2019, it had a population of 20 inhabitants.

References 

Populated places in the Province of Huesca